Tight hymenal ring is a disorder of the hymen, characterized by a rigid hymen and tight introitus, whether acquired or congenital. It excludes an imperforate hymen.

The individual with tight hymenal ring might face difficulty in inserting a tampon into the vagina or having intercourse. The condition can be relieved by outpatient surgery or manual dilation.

References

External links 

Gynaecologic disorders